Rick Duckett (born August 3, 1957) is an American college basketball coach who last served as the associate head coach for the Charleston Southern Buccaneers men's team. He has served as the head coach of the Fayetteville State Broncos, Winston-Salem State Rams and Grambling State Tigers and compiled a 156–98 overall record.

Coaching career
Duckett was born on August 3, 1957, and is a native of Winston-Salem, North Carolina. He attended Richard J. Reynolds High School in Winston-Salem. Duckett graduated from the University of North Carolina at Chapel Hill in 1979 and began his coaching career as the first African-American graduate assistant for the North Carolina Tar Heels during the 1979–80 season. He was the head coach of the freshman squad of the Harvard Crimson from 1980 to 1982. Duckett returned to his alma mater Reynolds to become an assistant coach for the basketball team for the 1982–1983 season. Duckett served one season stints as an assistant coach for the Jacksonville Dolphins, UCF Knights and South Carolina Gamecocks from 1983 to 1986. He was an assistant coach for the Wichita State Shockers from 1986 to 1992 and then returned to Reynolds High School as an assistant coach from 1992 to 1993.

Duckett received his first head coaching role for the Fayetteville Broncos in 1993 and remained there until 1998. He was the head coach of the Winston-Salem State Rams from 1998 to 2001 and accumulated a 73–19 record. He was named the NCAA Division II South Athletic Coach of the Year in 1999. Duckett won the CIAA Tournament Coaches Award in 1999 and 2000 as he led his teams to a championship both years. His two championship teams were inducted into Winston-Salem State's Big House Gaines Hall of Fame in 2012. Duckett left the Rams in 2001 to return as an assistant coach for the South Carolina Gamecocks, where he served for seven seasons and was known as the team's defensive coordinator.

Duckett was named head coach of the Grambling State Tigers in 2008 and signed a four-year contract. He coached the Tigers to a 6–23 overall record and 4–14 Southwestern Athletic Conference (SWAC) record. Duckett and two of his assistant coaches, Steve Portland and Phillip Stitt, were fired by Grambling State on September 25, 2009, in the wake of the death of Tigers player Henry White, who died on August 26, 2009 as a result of a preseason training exercise; Duckett was not present at the training as he was undergoing surgery. Duckett was not given a reason for his dismissal. He did not serve as a coach for two seasons and instead worked as a basketball color analyst for the UNC Greensboro Spartans on 101.1 WZTK-FM.

Duckett returned to coaching when he was hired as an assistant coach for the Tennessee State Tigers in 2011. He joined the Miami RedHawks as an associate head coach in 2012. Duckett was hired as the assistant head coach of the Charleston Southern Buccaneers on August 29, 2017.

References

1957 births
Living people
African-American basketball coaches
American men's basketball coaches
Basketball coaches from North Carolina
Charleston Southern Buccaneers men's basketball coaches
Fayetteville State Broncos basketball coaches
Grambling State Tigers men's basketball coaches
High school basketball coaches in North Carolina
Jacksonville Dolphins men's basketball coaches
Miami RedHawks men's basketball coaches
Sportspeople from Winston-Salem, North Carolina
South Carolina Gamecocks men's basketball coaches
Tennessee State Tigers basketball coaches
UCF Knights men's basketball coaches
Wichita State Shockers men's basketball coaches
Winston-Salem State Rams men's basketball coaches
21st-century African-American people
20th-century African-American sportspeople